Stephen Shaddon Bowling (born June 26, 1952) is a former Major League Baseball player. He batted and threw right-handed. Bowling played football and baseball at Webster High School in Tulsa and then at the University of Tulsa, where he was selected to the all-tournament team of the 1971 College World Series.

Playing career

Milwaukee Brewers (1976)
Bowling was drafted by the Milwaukee Brewers in the seventh round of the 1974 MLB Draft, and made his debut with the club on September 7, 1976, as he went 3 for 3 with a double, and RBI and a run scored in the Brewers 17-4 victory over the Cleveland Indians.  He recorded his first career hit off pitcher Don Hood.  Bowling finished the season with a .167 batting average with 0 HR and 2 RBI in 14 games.  On November 5, Bowling was selected by the Toronto Blue Jays in the 1976 MLB expansion draft.

Toronto Blue Jays (1977)
Bowling was the Toronto Blue Jays opening day right fielder in their first ever game on April 7, as he went 0 for 2 in the Jays 9-5 victory over the Chicago White Sox.  On August 26, Bowling hit his first (and only) career home run off Rick Langford of the Oakland Athletics.  Overall, Bowling appeared in 89 games with Toronto, batting .206 with 1 HR and 13 RBI.

Bowling would not play in Major League Baseball after the 1977 season, as in 1978, he split time with the Syracuse Chiefs of the  International League and Iowa Oaks of the American Association, then in 1979, he played for the Indianapolis Indians of the American Association before retiring.

Major League Career (1976–77)
Bowling appeared in 103 games in his career, batting .199 with 1 HR and 15 RBI.  He collected 47 career hits.

References

External links

Retrosheet

1952 births
Living people
All-American college baseball players
American expatriate baseball players in Canada
Baseball players from Oklahoma
Indianapolis Indians players
Iowa Oaks players
Knoxville Sox players
Leones del Caracas players
American expatriate baseball players in Venezuela
Major League Baseball outfielders
Milwaukee Brewers players
Newark Co-Pilots players
Sacramento Solons players
Spokane Indians players
Sportspeople from Tulsa, Oklahoma
Syracuse Chiefs players
Toledo Mud Hens players
Toronto Blue Jays players
Tulsa Golden Hurricane baseball players
Webster High School (Tulsa, Oklahoma) alumni